Sérgio Traguil is a Portuguese football manager that worked in Benfica Youth Teams 2009 to 2012, got the 3rd place of Ghana Premier League only 3 points behind the Winner with no defeat at home matches 2016, Won the best attack of Girabola 2018, He was in 1st position when FIFA removed 12 points regarding Rivaldo's case, achieve the State Cup Final with ENH from Mozambique Premier League, in 2020, then canceled by Covid 19, Won the Professional League Segundona, first ever of Club Desportivo da Lunda Sul without any defeat and with the best attack and Defense, and in 2022 Won the Championship with DTB/Singida Big Stars in Tanzania. One of the biggest achievements of the Manager was being from 2020 to 2022 without any defeats in League Matches .

References

1980 births
Living people
People from Portalegre, Portugal
Portuguese football managers
Sportspeople from Portalegre District